(born 16 August 1982) is a Japanese sprinter who specializes in the 400 metres.

He finished fourth in 4x400 m relay at the 2004 Olympic Games, together with teammates Yuki Yamaguchi, Jun Osakada and Mitsuhiro Sato.

His personal best time is 45.63 seconds, achieved in October 2003 in Fukuroi.

References

1982 births
Living people
Japanese male sprinters
Athletes (track and field) at the 2004 Summer Olympics
Olympic athletes of Japan